Lutesville was a city in Bollinger County, Missouri, United States. It was adjacent to and southwest of Marble Hill on Route 51 and Route 34. Crooked Creek flows between Lutesville and Marble Hill and Opossum Creek flows past to the south.

History
In 1869, the city was laid out to secure a St. Louis, Iron Mountain and Southern Railway depot location. It was named after its founder, Eli Lutes. The railroad ceased operations through Lutesville in 1973.

In 1985, the cities of Lutesville and Marble Hill merged to form one city, retaining the name Marble Hill. The former prospering city of Lutesville has been a part of the City of Marble Hill since then. Prior to the closing of the Lutesville post office in 1992, the Zip code of Lutesville was 63762.

Dry Creek Cemetery is located in Lutesville.

References 

Former populated places in Bollinger County, Missouri
Former cities in Missouri
Company towns in Missouri
St. Louis, Iron Mountain and Southern Railway
Populated places established in 1869
1869 establishments in Missouri
Populated places disestablished in 1985
1985 disestablishments in Missouri
Former populated places in Missouri